Sevin Okyay (Istanbul, 1942) is a Turkish literary critic, journalist, author, regular columnist and a prolific translator. Sevin had been a radio host and a teacher as well.

Biography
She is a graduate of the Arnavutköy American Girl's (High) School. During her youth she worked with Yıldız Moran, the first formally educated female photographer in Turkey. Okyay is best known for translating the Harry Potter books, and for her positive and appreciative criticism in Radikal, a Turkish newspaper. Her son, Kutlukhan Kutlu, is also following his mother's footsteps and is accompanying her in translating the Harry Potter series.

Okyay has been translating since 1963. She started working as a journalist in 1976. She writes mainly about cinema, literature, jazz and sports. She is hailed as a milestone of modern translation in Turkey. She used to have two cats who were twins, named after the Weasley twins. A serious jazz aficionado, she was the host of a radio show in Turkey, and her playlist included mainly jazz standards.

Selected bibliography
 Ilk Romanim (My First Novel) novel, 1996
 120 Filmde Seyriâlem (A Cinema Tour in 120 Films) selected movie critiques, 1996
 Çiçek Dürbünü (Kaleidoscope) collected essays, 1998

Selected translations
 Tales of the Early World, by Ted Hughes 
Ilk Dünya Hikayeleri YKY, 1999, 
 Delights of Turkey, by Edouard Roditi 
Türkiye Tatlari, YKY, 1999, 
 Raise High the Roof-Beam, Carpenters and Seymour: An Introduction, by J.D. Salinger 
Yükseltin Tavan Kirisini, Ustalar ve Seymour - bir Giris, with Coskun Yerli, YKY, 1999, 
 Animal Farm, by George Orwell 
Hayvanlar Çiftliği, YKY 2000
 Harry Potter and the Chamber of Secrets, by J.K. Rowling 
Harry Potter ve Sirlar Odasi, YKY 2001,  
 Harry Potter and the Prisoner of Azkaban, by J.K. Rowling 
Harry Potter ve Azkaban Tutsagi, with K. Kutlu, YKY 2001, 
 Harry Potter and the Goblet of Fire, by J.K. Rowling 
Harry Potter ve Ates Kadehi, with K. Kutlu, YKY 2001, 
 Fantastic Beasts and Where to Find Them?, by J.K. Rowling 
Fantastik Canavlar Nelerdir, Nerelerde Bulunurlar?, with Gül Sarioglu, YKY 2002, 
 Harry Potter and the Order of the Phoenix, by J.K. Rowling 
Harry Potter ve Zümrüdüanka Yoldasligi, with K. Kutlu, YKY 2003, 
 Harry Potter and the Half-Blood Prince, by J.K. Rowling 
Harry Potter ve Melez Prens, with K. Kutlu, YKY 2005,

External links
A collection of her critiques (in Turkish)
An article in English by Okyay on the 9th Flying Broom International Women's Film Festival

References

1942 births
Living people
Turkish translators
Translators from English
Translators to Turkish
Harry Potter in translation
Writers from Istanbul
Turkish women writers